Mario Lanzi (10 October 1914 – 21 February 1980) was an Italian athlete in the 1930s who specialised in the 800 metres and also competed over 400 metres.

Biography
Lanzi was born at Castelletto sopra Ticino, in the province of Novara (Piedmont).

He won the silver medal at the 1936 Summer Olympics in Berlin over 800 m, finishing behind John Woodruff. In his native Italy Lanzi was without any serious rival. However, Lanzi lost the 800 m final at the 1938 European Championships in Athletics to Rudolf Harbig. Lanzi was famous for confusing his opponents by starting 800 m races like a sprinter.

Lanzi died at Schio (Veneto), where he had worked as coach, in 1980.

National titles
Lanzi won 13 individual Italian national championship titles, 5 at 400 metres and 8 at 800 metres.
400 metres: 1937, 1940, 1941, 1942, 1943
800 metres: 1934, 1935, 1936, 1938, 1939, 1942, 1943, 1946

References

External links
 

1914 births
1980 deaths
Athletes (track and field) at the 1936 Summer Olympics
Italian male middle-distance runners
Olympic athletes of Italy
Sportspeople from the Province of Novara
European Athletics Championships medalists
Medalists at the 1936 Summer Olympics
Olympic silver medalists for Italy
Olympic silver medalists in athletics (track and field)
Italian Athletics Championships winners